James Richardson Spensley (17 May 1867 – 10 November 1915) was an English doctor, footballer, manager, Scout leader and medic from Stoke Newington, London. He is considered to be one of the "Fathers of Italian football", due to his association with Genoa CFC and his contribution to the modern day variation of the game in Italy.

Biography
He was born in 1867 in the Stoke Newington district of London to William Spensley and Elizabeth Alice Richardson. Although he was born and grew up in London, the Spensley family were originally from the Swaledale area in Yorkshire.

Richardson Spensley had the opportunity to travel far and wide as an adult. Amongst the most keen interests which he had acquired whilst travelling were eastern religions, languages (he was versed in Greek and Sanskrit), boxing and football. In addition to working as a doctor, he spent some time as a correspondent for the British newspaper the Daily Mail.

Football in Genoa
Richardson Spensley arrived in Genoa in 1896, initially for the purpose of curing English sailors on the coal ships. He joined Genoa Cricket & Athletics Club, a cricket and athletics club formed by British expatriates. He opened the footballing section for the club on 10 April 1897 and was put in place as its first ever manager. This was innovative as the modern day footballing scene in Italy was in its embryonic stages: if not for Edoardo Bosio in Turin founding clubs, there would have been no football at all in Italy at Richardson Spensley's time of arrival.

Richardson Spensley participated as a player-manager for Genoa in the first ever Italian Football Championship (which he initiated) during 1898 which his club won. The following season, he switched position from defender to goalkeeper, playing on until 1906.

Including the first title, Genoa won the Italian league six times while Richardson Spensley was at the helm. After retiring from playing when he was almost 40 years old, he stayed on in the management role for one more year, before leaving entirely.

Scouting and death
While living in England he had known Robert Baden-Powell who founded the Scout Movement, from whom he had received an autographed copy of Scouting for Boys. Along with a Genovese man named Mario Mazza, they founded the first Italian scouting movement called Federazione Italiana dello Scautismo in 1910.

During World War I, he worked in the medical field putting his scouting abilities to use as a lieutenant in the Royal Army Medical Corps. He was injured on the battle field while tending to the wounds of an enemy out of compassion. He died at Mainz, Germany in hospital not long after. His body was one of many moved in 1922 from smaller graveyards to larger cemeteries in Germany (no British bodies were returned to Britain). Spensley was reburied at Niederzwehren War Cemetery'' south of Kassel.

Honours
1898 Italian Football Championship (Genoa)
1899 Italian Football Championship (Genoa)
1900 Italian Football Championship (Genoa)
1902 Italian Football Championship (Genoa)
1903 Italian Football Championship (Genoa)
1904 Italian Football Championship (Genoa)

References

External links
A.G.E.S.C.I. Liguria – Founded by J.R. Spensley

1867 births
1915 deaths
Footballers from Stoke Newington
Scouting pioneers
Founders of association football institutions
English footballers
Genoa C.F.C. managers
Genoa C.F.C. players
Association football goalkeepers
Association football defenders
English football managers
British Army personnel of World War I
Royal Army Medical Corps officers
British military personnel killed in World War I
Burials at Niederzwehren War Cemetery
English expatriate sportspeople in Italy
Daily Mail journalists